Nailsworth is a town and civil parish in Gloucestershire, England, lying in one of the Stroud Valleys in the Cotswolds, on the A46 road (the Roman Fosse Way),  south of Stroud and about  north-east of Bristol and Bath. The parish had a population of 5,794 at the 2011 census.

History
Nailsworth in ancient times was a settlement at the confluence of the Avening Valley and the Woodchester Valley, on the Nailsworth Stream, and from the 1st or 2nd centuries CE on the Roman Fosse Way. Among many notable historic medieval buildings in the area are Beverston Castle and Owlpen Manor.

In the modern era, Nailsworth was a small mill town and centre for brewing. It was connected directly to the UK national rail network between 1867 and 1947, as the terminus of the Stonehouse and Nailsworth Railway.

Amenities
These days Nailsworth is visited in the summer by walkers. It holds a farmers' market every fourth Saturday in the month. Local events such as the market and the Nailsworth Festival are still announced by a town crier.

Over the past decade the small town centre has been reinvigorated. Besides numerous restaurants and cafes, it now contains a number of shops, including bakers, a delicatessen with a fishmonger, a hardware store, butchers, craft shops, bookshops, art galleries and a gardening shop. Nailsworth is a Fairtrade Town and twinned with the French town of Lèves, with which it enjoys an exchange visit in alternate years.

St George's Church

Built on the higher ground at the centre of town, St George's was consecrated in November 1900. Before 1895, the Church of England had provided for Nailsworth through several neighbouring parishes. The new church, which can now seat 500, was designed in the Early English style by M. H. Medland of Gloucester. Lack of funds, however, meant that the church originally consisted only of a nave, aisles and south porch, without a chancel or tower. The large entrance was originally designed as a tower, but the elevated ground was found to be too unstable to support the weight, resulting in the unusual porch.

The clock tower was constructed on the steep grass bank by the church, known as the clock on stilts, before finding its final resting place some yards away, by the present-day Nailsworth roundabout. At that time it was hidden behind a shop that sold the hard-worked local mill wool. Those walking up the steps from Mortimer Gardens can still see two of what remains of the stilts which used to hold the clock.

The chancel, Lady Chapel, and vestries dedicated to the memory of those who died in World War I, were added in 1939. A church tower was never added. In 1980 a large extension to the vestries was accomplished, turning them into a parish room. The church has no churchyard.

Three of the stained-glass windows in the south aisle, depicting St Luke, St Paul and St Barnabas, are by Charles Eamer Kempe. Three others depict St Richard of Chichester, St George and St Martin of Tours. A further window, by Herbert Bryans, shows Anna the Prophetess (Luke 2:36–38) The East window was designed by Peter Strong and installed in 1977. On the west wall is a mural painted by Sir Oliver Heywood in 1985, showing community life in the town.

Christ Church and Tabernacle Church

The Baptist chapel at Shortwood was rebuilt in 1837. Despite emigration of over 80 members to Adelaide 1838–1840, the adult congregation was at least 1,000 in 1851. In 1864 a dispute over a new minister led to the secession of some members, who opened a new chapel in 1868, in Bristol Road. This was known as Nailsworth Tabernacle Church. In 1910 the community rejoined the original Baptist church.

In 1967 the Shortwood congregation united with the Forest Green Congregationalists to form a new Christ Church, Nailsworth. Services alternated for some years with the Lower Forest Green Chapel, but the chapel in Newmarket Road, after modernisation, became the permanent place of worship in 1972. In that year Christ Church joined the new United Reformed Church, though retaining links with the Baptist Union. It had a membership of 147 in 1973.

Governance
An electoral ward in the same name exists. This mainly covers Nailsworth, but also stretches south to Horsley. The total ward population at the 2011 census was 6,614.

Twinned
Nailsworth is twinned with Lèves, France.
On November 27, 2019, Nailsworth signed a Friendship Agreement with the Village of Perry, New York, United States of America.

Sport and recreation
Forest Green Rovers is the premier football club in Nailsworth and plays in the EFL League One at The New Lawn stadium in Forest Green, after winning the 2017 National League Play-off Final and subsequently being promoted from League 2 in May 2022. In doing so, it made Nailsworth the smallest settlement ever to host an English Football League team. The town also has a non-League football club, Shortwood United F.C. at the Meadowbank Ground in Shortwood.

Notable people

In birth order:
Mary Deverell (1731–1805), sermon writer, poet and playwright, died here.
Joseph Edkins (1823–1905), translator and missionary to China, was born here.
W. H. Davies (1871–1940), Newport-born tramp poet, lived here from the mid-1920s until his death.
John Furnival (1933–2020), artist of visual and concrete poetry who lived most of his life near Nailsworth.
Michael Bichard, Baron Bichard (born 1947), civil servant, is from Nailsworth.
Pete Reed (born 1981), Olympic rower, was brought up in Nailsworth.

See also
Moschatel Press

References

External links

Nailsworth Town Council web site
BBC archive film of Nailsworth from 1985
Stroud Voices (Nailsworth filter) – oral history site

 
Towns in Gloucestershire